Chez Hélène is a children's television series produced by and broadcast on CBC Television. The 15-minute weekday program was broadcast on the English television network to provide viewers with exposure to the French language.

The program was produced at CBC's Montreal studios. It began its 14-season run on 26 October 1959, with the final program airing 25 May 1973.

Hélène Baillargeon portrayed the title role. Other cast members were Madeline Kronby who portrayed the bilingual Louise, and a mouse puppet named Suzie who generally spoke English. Corinne Orr provided the voice for Suzie.

In terms of children's series, the program remained popular in its final season, with a reported 437,000 viewers recorded by BBM in November 1972. But CBC executives cancelled the series, claiming that it had run its course, and that the network's broadcasts of Sesame Street would incorporate five minutes of French-language segments per episode. By the end of the 1970s, a newer program, Passe-Partout started airing on CBC Television's French counterpart, Ici Radio-Canada Télé.

References

External links
Chez Helene – Canadian Communication Foundation
Queen's University Directory of CBC Television Series (Chez Hélène archived listing link via archive.org)

1959 Canadian television series debuts
1973 Canadian television series endings
1950s Canadian children's television series
CBC Television original programming
Television shows filmed in Montreal
French-language education television programming
1960s Canadian children's television series
1970s Canadian children's television series
Black-and-white Canadian television shows
Canadian television shows featuring puppetry